In enzymology, a tartrate dehydrogenase is an enzyme that catalyzes the chemical reaction

tartrate + NAD+  oxaloglycolate + NADH + H+

Thus, the two substrates of this enzyme are tartrate and NAD+, whereas its 3 products are oxaloglycolate, NADH, and H+.

This enzyme belongs to the family of oxidoreductases, specifically those acting on the CH-OH group of donor with NAD+ or NADP+ as acceptor. The systematic name of this enzyme class is tartrate:NAD+ oxidoreductase. This enzyme is also called mesotartrate dehydrogenase. This enzyme participates in glyoxylate and dicarboxylate metabolism. It employs one cofactor, manganese.

References

 

EC 1.1.1
NADH-dependent enzymes
Manganese enzymes
Enzymes of known structure